The British rock band Queen was well known for its diverse music style in contemporary rock. Their large sound systems, lighting rigs, innovative pyrotechnics and extravagant costumes often gave shows a theatrical nature. Artists such as Bob Geldof, George Michael, David Bowie, and Robbie Williams have expressed admiration for lead singer Freddie Mercury's stage presence.

Queen wrote certain songs, such as "We Will Rock You" and "We Are the Champions", with the goal of audience participation. "Radio Ga Ga" came to inspire synchronized hand-clapping (this routine, originating from the song's video, was the invention of the video's director, David Mallet). This influenced Queen's appearance at Live Aid, where the 72,000-person crowd at Wembley Stadium would sing loudly and clap their hands in unison. Queen's performance at Live Aid was later voted the greatest live show of all time by a group of over 60 musicians, critics, and executives in a poll conducted by Channel 4.

1970s
Queen played approximately 700 live performances during their career with roughly two-thirds during the 1970s. Their early performances were generally hard rock, but the band developed a noticeably more pop-oriented sound in later years. Many of their future trademarks first appeared in these early shows, although some could be traced back to the members' previous bands and artistic outlets (e.g., Smile, Ibex later renamed as Wreckage, and Sour Milk Sea).

Freddie Mercury often dressed in a flamboyant manner and acted with camp, while dry ice and multi-coloured lights were used. During the concerts, it was typical for both Brian May and Roger Taylor to have impromptu, instrumental interludes and for Mercury to engage in a crowd 'shout-along' whereas it was traditional for Taylor to sing one song. Brian May and John Deacon sang backup vocals. Other distinguishable trademarks were Mercury's microphone, which featured only the upper part of the stand with no base (which allegedly came about while Mercury was with "Wreckage" during which the bottom of his stand accidentally broke off), a grand piano, and May's hand-built electric guitar, the Red Special. The lengthy guitar solo by May showcased his use of a multiple-delay effect, helping create a layered atmosphere. Rarely, Queen would host a non-member on stage with them, the most notable being keyboardist Spike Edney who performed with the band during the 1980s. A semi-informal medley of 1950s rock 'n' roll songs (especially "Big Spender" and "Jailhouse Rock") was also a staple and usually formed the backbone of an encore. The band's logo, designed by Mercury shortly before the release of the first album, is made up of the band's star signs and was usually displayed on the front of Taylor's bass drum during their early tours. Some stage costumes worn by Mercury and May on their earliest tours and a few subsequent tours were created by fashion designer Zandra Rhodes.

The concert duration and set-list for each Queen show progressed significantly during its career, eventually leading to shows exceeding two hours. Queen performed most of the songs released on their studio albums during concerts. So far, two shows have been officially released as concert videos from this era, which are the November 1974 show at the Rainbow and the Christmas Eve 1975 show at the Hammersmith Odeon.

Lisa Marie Presley stated that the first rock concert she attended was by Queen in Los Angeles in the late 70s. After the show, she gave Mercury a scarf that belonged to her late father.

Queen – Queen II Tours
With the release of their first two albums Queen & Queen II, the band began live performing in earnest, essentially following the traditional 'album-tour' cycle throughout the 70s. The embryonic Queen played numerous gigs in and around London in the early seventies, but evidence suggests that its first performance was on 27 June 1970 at Truro in England. The band's first major step toward becoming a recognized live act came when Queen was a support act to Mott the Hoople on its UK tour. Queen's performances consistently received an enthusiastic reception from audiences. This led to Mott the Hoople inviting Queen to be its support act for Hoople's US tour. Here, the band was able to hone its on-stage presentations in front of large crowds, try out different songs and arrangements, and gain experience with state-of-the-art light and sound systems. The Queen song "Now I'm Here" was written by Brian May as a tribute to Mott The Hoople.

Sheer Heart Attack Tour
The year 1974 had started with their first trip outside of Europe and an appearance at the Sunbury Music Festival in Australia. Although the band headlined the event on 2 February, their appearance the next day was canceled. In March, the band commenced on their first headlining tour of the United Kingdom to promote their new album Queen II, and then embark on their first trip to the USA. Once again, they supported Mott The Hoople on a four-week tour beginning in April. The band paid more attention to their look on stage and employed the services of Zandra Rhodes to design some of their costumes, such as Freddie Mercury and Brian May's white and black wingsuits. Queen's supporting stint came to an abrupt halt, however, when May collapsed from hepatitis after the New York show on 11 May, and they all had to fly home so that he could recover.

The band were soon back on the road and commenced their second tour as the headlining act, with nineteen concerts at eighteen different venues around the UK. The band rotated supporting acts, and the setlist contained much of the material from the new album Sheer Heart Attack. With more money to invest in a new stage show, the band wore new costumes for this tour and added an additional lighting rig, complete with state of the art stage effects. To conclude Queen's touring for the year, they extended the leg with mainland European shows, consisting of ten shows in six countries, performing over a two-and-a-half-week period. The year 1975 started with the American leg of the tour, before transferring to Japan. The tour would have been longer, but an accident involving the truck that transported their equipment meant it was not able to reach the remaining scheduled venues, which would have been a second American leg for the tour. In late February, on the North American tour, a handful of shows were cancelled due to Freddie Mercury's voice failing on him. After several doctor's visits, he was diagnosed with vocal fold nodules, which would impact him for the rest of his life. With this, several more shows were cancelled to allow for a more lenient touring schedule for his voice.

There were slight differences between the European, North American and Japanese sets. The Japanese shows were a bit longer; the band added Doing All Right to the set, extended Killer Queen to include the second verse, and added See What A Fool I've Been to the end of some shows as well as reviving Hangman on the final night of the tour, almost certainly due to the warm welcome they received from the Japanese fans. Additionally, for the North American leg, Seven Seas of Rhye was dropped from the setlist due to it picking up little attention from listeners.

The band planned to return to the United States in late 1975 to play arena shows, however these were all cancelled, most likely due to Queen wanting to distance themselves from Trident and switching managers to John Reid. The shows most likely wouldn't have been profitable, seeing as Queen didn't tour arenas in the United States until 1977.

A Night at the Opera Tour
The tour marked the debut of "Bohemian Rhapsody", which would be played at every Queen gig thereafter.

The DVD A Night at the Odeon is taken from the Christmas Eve concert at the Hammersmith Odeon. "It's quite something to watch", said Brian May. "We were just a four-piece, but we made a lot of noise. I'm quite shocked at how good it was. We were incredibly tight and, at the same time – because we knew each other so well – very loose in terms of improvisation."

Summer Gigs 1976
Queen played four shows during a short UK tour during September 1976. Beginning on 1 September, Queen played in Edinburgh, as well as on the following night on 2 September. On 10 September, they played in Cardiff, which was Queen's second and final show in the city, having played there on the previous tour in 1975.

The final Queen show of the year was in Hyde Park, performed on 18 September after the hot summer of 1976. The Hyde Park gig was in fact a free concert, which drew in a crowd of about 180,000. The free concert was organised by Richard Branson, an entrepreneur at the time.

The Hyde Park show has several audio sources available, including a soundboard source. The only other concert on the tour with available audio is the second Edinburgh concert, which has an audience recording in circulation.

This tour features the debut performances of "You Take My Breath Away," and "Tie Your Mother Down" (Tie Your Mother Down was not played at Hyde Park due to limited time), about 3 months before A Day At The Races was released.

A Day at the Races Tour

News of the World

Jazz

Crazy Tour

1980s

The Game Tour

Hot Space Tour

The Works Tour

Live Aid
The performance at Live Aid at Wembley Stadium in 1985 is often regarded as Queen's greatest single live performance. Their set lasted 21 minutes and consisted of a version of "Bohemian Rhapsody" (ballad section and guitar solo) slightly sped up in lyrics, "Radio Ga Ga", a crowd singalong, "Hammer to Fall", "Crazy Little Thing Called Love", "We Will Rock You" (1st verse), and "We Are the Champions". Mercury and May returned later on to perform a version of "Is This the World We Created?" The band were unenthusiastic about performing when they were first approached by Bob Geldof, but the acclaim they received after their performance led to them writing, collectively, the song "One Vision" which was then released as a single.

The Magic Tour

1990s
Queen did not perform any concerts in their original line-up in the 1990s. After Freddie Mercury's death in November 1991, Queen organised The Freddie Mercury Tribute Concert and took place in April 1992 at Wembley Stadium. The three remaining members (in one of the few concerts they played together after Mercury's death) and a host of special guests staged a lengthy and emotional show billed as the Concert For AIDS Awareness (as well as Concert for Life) that was televised worldwide. Queen appeared only sporadically following the concert. Not all appearances featured all three surviving members. The final occasion where all remaining members of Queen performed on stage was in January 1997 at Paris in France for the world premiere of Bejart Ballet For Life. Joining the surviving trio were Spike Edney on keyboards/backing-vocals and Elton John who sang lead vocals. They only performed one song, namely "The Show Must Go On" which was one of the two songs they had performed together at The Freddie Mercury Tribute Concert, and this was the last reported appearance of John Deacon on stage.

2000s

Following Freddie Mercury's death and John Deacon's retirement, May and Taylor continued to make sporadic live appearances in addition to their long-term collaboration with Paul Rodgers.

One-off performances

Queen + Paul Rodgers Tour

Rock the Cosmos Tour

2010s

Queen + Adam Lambert Tour 2012

Queen + Adam Lambert Tour 2014–2015

Queen + Adam Lambert 2016 Summer Festival Tour

Queen + Adam Lambert Tour 2017–2018

The Rhapsody Tour

Queen's line-up (live)

See also
Concerts for the People of Kampuchea
Rock in Rio
Live Aid
The Freddie Mercury Tribute Concert
Party at the Palace
46664 Concerts

References

Further reading
 Greg Brooks, Chris Charlesworth. Queen Live: A Concert Documentary. London: Omnibus Press, 1995. 

Lists of concert tours